Werbig station is a railway station in the east of the district Märkisch-Oderland of Brandenburg. In it, the Prussian Eastern Railway (Berlin - Kostrzyn nad Odrą) and the Eberswalde–Frankfurt (Oder) railway intersect. The plant is located in the city's Seelow district of Neulangsow; the eponymous district Werbig is located southwest of it. It is served by the lines RB 26 and RB 60.

References

Railway stations in Brandenburg
Railway stations in Germany opened in 1880
1880 establishments in Prussia
Buildings and structures in Märkisch-Oderland